The Pilot Butte storm of 1995 was a powerful storm and tornado that devastated Pilot Butte, Saskatchewan on August 26, 1995. At about 4:40 p.m., a major wind and hailstorm started in the town. The storm later spawned a tornado, which touched down at the west edge of the town limits, demolishing a farmyard and cement plant.

Occurrence
The tornado hit Pilot Butte at approximately 4:40 p.m. on August 26, 1995.          A ball tournament was being held at the same time as the storm hit. The hailstorm came in first, which produced golf ball sized hail. Later, a tornado formed on the west edge of the town limits. The south and west ends of the town were effected heavily, however, every property in the town had some damage done to it. Over 500 homes in the community were left without power, resulting in Sask Power crews having to come to restore power.

State of emergency

At 5:45 p.m., a state of local emergency was declared for Pilot Butte and its surrounding area. On site emergency responders came from Pilot Butte and Regina, some of which included the Regina Emergency Communications Team, the Saskatchewan Emergency Measures Organization and the local R.C.M.P. Portable water, shelter, food and emergency building materials were provided by the Red Cross and by Provincial Social Services for those who needed it. The rink became a temporary hospital.

Aftermath

Tattered siding and shingles on houses, broken windows in buildings, and dented cars were all common in Pilot Butte. The Betteridge farmstead, next to the town, was reduced to a pile of rubble. Yet the most heartfelt loss in some ways involved the more than 2400 trees that were marred and subjected to removal. Flooding became a major result of the storm, parts of the town and Regina were flooded with 25 cm of rain within 1 hour of the storm. Golfball and larger hail left drifts 50 cm deep in several places around the town. The worst damage from the storm was in the west and south ends of the town, where a farmyard and cement plant were demolished, along with many homes and all of the trailer park, the 72-unit trailer park was in total ruin. Almost all trees in the town were damaged and uprooted, resulting in very messy streets full of broken trees and branches. After one month, the town was back to normal and rebuilding started up, about a decade later, the cement plant was fully rebuilt.

Legacy 
In August 2020, residents of the town observed a 25-year-anniversary of the event.

Junior hockey team

In 2001, Pilot Butte's junior hockey team was renamed from the Express to the Storm to remember the Pilot Butte Storm of 1995. Since then, the Storm won the division title in 2008, 2010, 2013, 2014 and 2015. The Storm won the Athol Murray Trophy in 2007, 2008, 2011 and 2012 to earn the right to represent the Saskatchewan Hockey Association at the Keystone Cup. In 2011 the Storm had their best result in team history finishing as Keystone Cup Bronze medalist.

References

1995 disasters in Canada
Pilot Butte, Saskatchewan
1995 in Saskatchewan
Tornadoes in Saskatchewan
1995-08-26